SweeTarts (officially stylized as SweeTARTS) are sweet and sour candies invented under the direction of Menlo F. Smith, CEO of Sunline Inc., in 1962. The candy was created using the same basic recipe as the already popular Pixy Stix and Lik-M-Aid (Fun Dip) products in order to broaden the market for the tangy taste sensation. In 1963, SweeTarts were introduced with the same flavors as the popular Pixy Stix: cherry, grape, lemon, lime, and orange. Taffy products are also produced with the SweeTarts brand.

Sunline, Inc., became a division of the Sunmark of St Louis' group of companies, which was later acquired in 1986 by Rowntree Mackintosh of the United Kingdom, which was, in turn, taken over by Nestlé. The Willy Wonka brand candies were developed by Sunmark in a joint venture with The Quaker Company. Sunmark eventually acquired the rights to Willy Wonka and established a division with that name which produced the Willy Wonka brands. The Wonka symbol was subsequently applied to most Sunmark brands. Nestlé has since sold its confectionery businesses to Ferrero SpA.

Related products

SweeTarts also come in a variety of other products including gum, little Sweet Tarts (often packaged to be handed out as Halloween trick-or-treat candy), SweeTart "hearts" for Valentine's Day, "chicks, ducks and bunnies" shaped SweeTarts for Easter and SweeTarts Jelly Beans (marketed for Easter in some regions of the US), "skulls and bones" for Halloween, and Giant Chewy SweeTarts, which are a larger, chewier variant of SweeTarts that come four to a package. They are an ellipsoid shape, the size of a silver dollar and ¼ inch thick. The Giant Chewy SweeTarts have also retained the orange flavor discontinued in the standard SweeTarts products, as have the Mini Chewy SweeTarts variety. SweeTarts Soft & Chewy Ropes are available in Cherry Punch, Strawberry, and Sour Apple, as well as a "Twisted" flavor, and were originally named Kazoozles. Two now-discontinued flavors of Kazoozles that were produced under Nestlé were Pink Lemonade and Strawberry Watermelon. There is also an offshoot of SweeTart Ropes known as SweeTart Ropes Bites, which are bite-sized pieces of the Ropes coated with a sweetener and coming in many flavors not present in standard Ropes packages.

Flavors
 Red: Cherry
 Purple: Grape
 Blue: Blue Punch
 Orange: Orange (retired as of 2013)
 Green: Green Apple (lime before 2002)
 Yellow: Lemon

In 2002, Nestlé replaced the original lime with green apple. In 2009, Nestlé stopped making lemon (yellow), but put it back into the lineup of flavors in 2013. The current flavors in the SweeTarts roll are: blue punch (blue), cherry (red), grape (purple), lemon (yellow) and green apple (green). Retired flavors include lime (the former flavor for green) and orange.

See also
 Smarties
 Love Hearts

References

External links

Products introduced in 1962
Candy
Brand name confectionery
The Willy Wonka Candy Company brands